Mirak  may refer to:

Mirak Bahadur Jalair, Mughal sardar of Sylhet
Mirak (Star Fleet Universe), a race of beings in Star Fleet Universe
Mirak, Armenia, a town in Armenia
Mirək, a village in Azerbaijan
Mirak, Iran, a village in Kurdistan Province, Iran
Mirak, Kermanshah, a village in Kermanshah Province, Iran
Epsilon Boötis, a star also called Mirak
Mirak (rocket), a rocket developed by the German Verein für Raumschiffahrt in the early 1930s

See also 
 Miraka (disambiguation)